Jestetten is a municipality in the district of Waldshut in Baden-Württemberg in Germany.

History
In 1806 Jestetten became part of Baden.

From 1840 until 1935, the territory of Jestetten together with Altenburg, Lottstetten and what was then Dettighofen, was part of the region which formed a customs exclusion zone and was not part of the German customs area. Inhabitants were able to offer their produce to the rest of Germany as well as to Switzerland. This situation brought about a higher standard of living and prosperity compared to the rest of Germany.

Geography
The border crossing into Switzerland is located to the east of town along Schaffhauserstraße leading to Neuhausen am Rheinfall. Another border crossing in the municipality is located south west of town along Osterfingerstraße, towards the villager of Osterfingen in Wilchingen municipality, Schaffhausen canton.

Transport
Jestetten railway station is situated on the Swiss Federal Railway's cross-border Eglisau-Neuhausen railway line and is served by Zurich S-Bahn line S9. Jestetten is one of only two Swiss operated stations located entirely within Germany, the other being Lottstetten. Until December 2010 a third station was stil in operation, namely Altenburg-Rheinau, located in Altenburg, part of Jestetten, close to the border with Neuhausen am Rheinfall, Switzerland, however despite protests from the German authorities, the station was closed by the Swiss due to low passenger numbers.

None of the lines running to or through Jestetten have a direct rail connection to the German railway network.

The station is a border station and as such is in local transport tariff zones in both Germany and Switzerland.

Trains which pass through Jestetten without stopping at any of the stations on the line in Germany, are not subject to any customs formalities or restrictions of either country, despite the train and its passengers technically leaving the Swiss Customs Area, entering the European Union customs area and entering Swiss customs territory again. An agreement in this respect was entered into by the two countries and became law in 1936.

References

Waldshut (district)
Baden
Germany–Switzerland border crossings